"Rescue Me" is a song by American DJ and producer Marshmello featuring American rock band A Day to Remember. The song was released on June 14, 2019, along with its official music video. It is the first single from Marshmello's third album, Joytime III.

Release and promotion
Marshmello teased the single on Twitter, and the fact that the single will be the first single from his forthcoming album Joytime III.

Charts

Weekly charts

Year-end charts

References

2019 songs
2019 singles
A Day to Remember songs
Marshmello songs
Songs written by Marshmello